"435" is a song by American hip hop artist Tyler, the Creator, released as a digital single on May 22, 2018. It was written and produced by Tyler, the Creator. It was released unannounced, similar to "Okra". The song revolves around a sample of  Saint Etienne’s 4:35 In The Morning.

A music video, filmed by Luis "Panch" Perez, was released simultaneously with the single.

Background and release 
As with "Okra", "435" was released with no prior announcement on May 22, 2018, following a series of Twitter posts from Tyler, the Creator explaining that the song had been recorded in early February 2018 on a Philadelphia tour stop on his tour with Vince Staples, and that the song was "not an indication of how future [songs] will sound".

Music video 
The music video for "435" was filmed by Luis "Panch" Perez, featuring a "one shot" take of Tyler, the Creator in a music recording studio.

Track listing

Credits and personnel 
Credits adapted from Tidal.

 Tyler, the Creator – composition, production, vocals
Mark Waterfield - composition
Sarah Cracknell - composition
 Neal Pogue – mix engineering
 Mike Bozzi – master engineering
Zach Acosta - assistant engineer
Vic Wainstein – record engineering

References

External links 
 

2018 singles
2018 songs
Tyler, the Creator songs
Songs written by Sarah Cracknell
Songs written by Tyler, the Creator